2000 Romanian elections may refer to:

 2000 Romanian general election
 2000 Romanian local elections